Eva Respini (born 1976) is a curator of contemporary art. She is the Deputy Director for Curatorial Affairs and Barbara Lee Chief Curator at the Institute of Contemporary Art, Boston and a lecturer at Harvard University Graduate School of Design.

Early life and education 
Respini was born and raised in Europe, but has lived in the United States for over two decades. Her father is Italian and her mother is Norwegian. She has lived in Croatia (then Yugoslavia), France, Italy, and Switzerland. She received a bachelor's degree in Art History and master's degree in Modern Art and Critical Theory from Columbia University, and was a 2014 fellow at the Center for Curatorial Leadership.

Career 
She is the Deputy Director for Curatorial Affairs and Barbara Lee Chief Curator at the Institute of Contemporary Art, Boston (ICA), where she has been since 2015. Prior to the ICA, Respini was a curator at the Museum of Modern Art, where she organized contemporary art and photography exhibitions.

At the ICA, Respini has curated solo presentations with artists including Firelei Báez (2021), Deana Lawson (2021), John Akomfrah (2019), Huma Bhabha (2019), and William Forsythe (2018), as well as thematic exhibitions such as When Home Won’t Let You Stay: Migration through Contemporary Art (2019) and Art in the Age of the Internet, 1989 to Today (2018). At the Museum of Modern Art, her noteworthy exhibitions include retrospectives of Walid Raad (2015) and Cindy Sherman (2012).

Respini is the co-commissioner and curator of the U.S. Pavilion's historic Simone Leigh exhibition for the 59th Venice Biennale in 2022. Respini is also working with Leigh on her first museum survey exhibition, scheduled for 2023 at the ICA.

In addition to her work as a curator, Respini teaches seminars on curating contemporary art at Harvard University Graduate School of Design. She is the author of many books and catalogues, and contributes magazine and journal articles on the topics of contemporary art and photography.

References

External links 

American women curators
American art curators
Living people
1976 births
Writers from Boston
Harvard University faculty
American writers of Italian descent
American people of Norwegian descent
People associated with the Museum of Modern Art (New York City)
Writers from New York City
Columbia College (New York) alumni
Columbia Graduate School of Arts and Sciences alumni